This is a list of film serials by studio, separated into those released by each of the five major studios, and the remaining minor studios.

The five major studios produced the greater number of serials. Of these the main studios are considered to be Columbia Pictures, Universal Pictures, and Republic Pictures. All three were active during the 1930s and 1940s. The other two major studios are Mascot Pictures, which later merged into Republic, and Pathé Exchange, which ceased serial production before the advent of sound.

Major studios
These studios were the main producers of serials.

Columbia Pictures

{| class="wikitable"
|-
!Number
!Serial title
!Year
!Chapters
!Genre
!Director
!Cast
!Notes
|-
|1
|Jungle Menace
|1937
|15
|Jungle
|Harry L. Fraser and George Melford
|Frank Buck
|The first three Columbia serials were not produced by the studio. They were made independently by the Weiss Bros. studio and released by Columbia. Columbia established its own serial unit in 1938.
|-
|2
|The Mysterious Pilot
|1937
|15
|Aviation
|Spencer Gordon Bennet
|Frank Hawks
|
|-
|3
|The Secret of Treasure Island
|1938
|15
|Mystery
|Elmer Clifton
|Don Terry
|
|-
|4
|The Great Adventures of Wild Bill Hickok
|1938
|15
|Western
|Mack V. Wright and Sam Nelson
|Gordon Elliott
|The actor later known as Bill Elliott was billed as "Gordon Elliott" in the original release; the billing was changed to "William Elliott" for the 1949 reissue
|-
|5
|The Spider's Web
|1938
|15
|Superhero
|Ray Taylor and James W. Horne
|Warren Hull
|
|-
|6
|Flying G-Men
|1939
|15
|Aviation
|Ray Taylor and James W. Horne
|Robert Paige
|
|-
|7
|Mandrake the Magician
|1939
|12
|Fantasy
|Sam Nelson and Norman Deming
|Warren Hull
|
|-
|8
|Overland with Kit Carson
|1939
|15
|Western
|Sam Nelson and Norman Deming
|Bill Elliott
|
|-
|9
|The Shadow
|1940
|15
|SuperheroMystery
|James W. Horne
|Victor Jory
|
|-
|10
|Terry and the Pirates
|1940
|15
|JungleFantasy
|James W. Horne
|William Tracy
|
|-
|11
|Deadwood Dick
|1940
|15
|Western
|James W. Horne
|Don Douglas
|
|-
|12
|The Green Archer
|1940
|15
|Mystery
|James W. Horne
|Victor Jory
|
|-
|13
|White Eagle
|1941
|15
|Western
|James W. Horne
|Buck Jones
|
|-
|14
|The Spider Returns
|1941
|15
|Superhero
|James W. Horne
|Warren Hull
|
|-
|15
|The Iron Claw
|1941
|15
|Mystery
|James W. Horne
|Charles Quigley
|
|-
|16
|Holt of the Secret Service
|1941
|15
|Crime drama
|James W. Horne
|Jack Holt
|
|-
|17
|Captain Midnight
|1942
|15
|Aviation
|James W. Horne
|Dave O'Brien
|
|-
|18
|Perils of the Royal Mounted
|1942
|15
|Northern
|James W. Horne
|Robert Stevens
|
|-
|19
|  |The Secret Code
|1942
|15
|Crime drama
|Spencer G. Bennet
|Paul Kelly
|Columbia's association with serial producer Larry Darmour and director James Horne lapsed when both men died in 1942. The studio took over serial production beginning with The Secret Code, using its feature-film staff. Producer Sam Katzman assumed serial production in 1944.
|-
|20
|The Valley of Vanishing Men|1942
|15
|Western
|Spencer G. Bennet
|Bill Elliott
|
|-
|21
|Batman|1943
|15
|Superhero
|Lambert Hillyer
|Lewis WilsonDouglas Croft
|
|-
|22
|The Phantom|1943
|15
|Superhero, Jungle
|B. Reeves Eason
|Tom Tyler
|
|-
|23
|The Desert Hawk|1944
|15
|Adventure
|B. Reeves Eason
|Gilbert Roland
|
|-
|24
|Black Arrow|1944
|15
|Western
|Lew Landers and (uncredited) B. Reeves Eason
|Robert Scott
|
|-
|25
|Brenda Starr, Reporter|1945
|13
|Crime drama
|Wallace Fox
|Joan Woodbury
|First of the Sam Katzman-produced serials. Katzman remained producer until the final film, released in 1956.
|-
|26
|The Monster and the Ape|1945
|15
|Science fiction
|Howard Bretherton
|Robert Lowery
|
|-
|27
||Jungle Raiders|1945
|15
|Jungle
|Lesley Selander
|Kane Richmond
|
|-
|28
|Who's Guilty?|1945
|15
|Mystery
|Howard Bretherton and Wallace Grissell
|Robert Kent
|
|-
|29
|Hop Harrigan|1946
|15
|Aviation
|Derwin Abrahams
|William Bakewell
|
|-
|30
|Chick Carter, Detective|1946
|15
|Crime drama
|Derwin Abrahams
|Lyle Talbot
|
|-
|31
|Son of the Guardsman|1946
|15
|Medieval
|Derwin Abrahams
|Bob Shaw
|
|-
|32
|Jack Armstrong|1947
|15
|Science fiction
|Wallace Fox
|John Hart
|
|-
|33
|The Vigilante|1947
|15
|Western
|Wallace Fox
|Ralph Byrd
|
|-
|34
|The Sea Hound|1947
|15
|Maritime
|Walter B. Eason and Mack V. Wright
|Buster Crabbe
|
|-
|35
|Brick Bradford|1947
|15
|Science fiction
|Spencer Gordon Bennet and Thomas Carr
|Kane Richmond
|
|-
|36
|Tex Granger|1948
|15
|Western
|Derwin Abrahams
|Robert Kellard
|
|-
|37
|Superman|1948
|15
|Superhero
|Spencer Gordon Bennet and Thomas Carr
|Kirk AlynNoel Neill
|
|-
|38
|Congo Bill|1948
|15
|Adventure
|Spencer Gordon Bennet and Thomas Carr
|Don McGuireCleo Moore
|
|-
|39
|Bruce Gentry|1949
|15
|Science fiction
|Spencer G. Bennet and Thomas Carr
|Tom Neal
|
|-
|40
|Batman and Robin|1949
|15
|Superhero
|Spencer Gordon Bennet
|Robert LoweryJohnny Duncan
|
|-
|41
|Adventures of Sir Galahad|1950
|15
|Fantasy
|Spencer Gordon Bennet
|George Reeves
|
|-
|42
|Cody of the Pony Express|1950
|15
|Western
|Spencer Gordon Bennet
|Jock O'Mahoney
|
|-
|43
|Atom Man vs. Superman|1950
|15
|AdventureScience Fiction
|Spencer Gordon Bennet
|Kirk AlynLyle Talbot
|
|-
|44
|Pirates of the High Seas|1950
|15
|ActionAdventureCrime
|Spencer Gordon Bennet and Thomas Carr
|Buster Crabbe
|
|-
|45
|Roar of the Iron Horse|1951
|15
|Western
|Spencer Gordon Bennet and Thomas Carr
|Jock O'Mahoney
|
|-
|46
|Mysterious Island|1951
|15
|AdventureScience FictionFantasy
|Spencer Gordon Bennet
|Richard Crane
|
|-
|47
|Captain Video: Master of the Stratosphere|1951
|15
|AdventureHorrorScience Fiction
|Spencer Gordon Bennet
|Judd Holdren
|
|-
|48
|King of the Congo|1952
|15
|AdventureFantasy
|Spencer Gordon Bennet
|Buster Crabbe
|
|-
|49
|Blackhawk|1952
|15
|AdventureHorrorScience Fiction
|Spencer Gordon Bennet
|Kirk Alyn
|
|-
|50
|Son of Geronimo|1952
|15
|Western
|Spencer Gordon Bennet
|Clay Moore
|
|-
|51
|The Lost Planet|1953
|15
|HorrorScience fiction
|Spencer Gordon Bennet
|Judd Holdren
|
|-
|52
|The Great Adventures of Captain Kidd|1953
|15
|Maritime
|Derwin Abrahams and Charles S. Gould
|Richard Crane
|
|-
|53
|Gunfighters of the Northwest|1954
|15
|Western
|Spencer Gordon Bennet
|Jack Mahoney
|Filmed entirely outdoors.
|-
|54
|Riding with Buffalo Bill|1954
|15
|Western
|Spencer Gordon Bennet
|Marshall Reed
|
|-
|55
|The Adventures of Captain Africa|1955
|15
|Superhero, Jungle
|Spencer Gordon Bennet
|John Hart
|Aborted remake of the 1943 serial The Phantom. The film had already been completed when the producer learned that the studio no longer held the rights to the comic-strip character. Portions of the film were reshot, with actor John Hart wearing a more generic costume and "The Phantom" renamed "Captain Africa."
|-
|56
|Perils of the Wilderness|1956
|15
|Western
|Spencer Gordon Bennet
|Dennis Moore
|
|-
|57
|Blazing the Overland Trail|1956
|15
|Western
|Spencer Gordon Bennet
|Dennis Moore
|Last serial produced by any studio
|-
|}

Mascot Pictures

Note: Mascot later became part of Republic (see below)

Pathé Exchange

Note: All of Pathé Exchange's serials were Silent

Republic Pictures

Universal Pictures

Universal produced more serials (137) than any other company.

Minor studios
These studios produced only small numbers of serials. They were either small, independent studios themselves or major studios not interested in the serial market.
|The Return of Chandu''

See also
 Movie serial
 List of film serials

References

Serials by studio